The Northern Iowa Panthers are the athletic teams of the University of Northern Iowa. The university is a member of the Missouri Valley Conference and competes in NCAA Division I (Division I FCS in football).

History 
The school's mascot is the Panther. They participate in the Missouri Valley Conference for all sports except football and wrestling, in which they are a member of the Missouri Valley Football Conference (formerly the Gateway Football Conference) and  the Big Twelve Conference.  Northern Iowa previously competed in the Iowa Intercollegiate Athletic Conference (now known as the American Rivers Conference), North Central Conference, and the Mid-Continent Conference (now known as the Summit League).

History of UNI nickname 
On September 8, 1931, the following appeal appeared in the student newspaper, the College Eye, under the headline "Contest Started for School Name":

"Who wants to be called Tutors, Pedagogues, and Teachers all the time? Every leading school in the country has some name by which they are known in the realm of sport. Iowa is known as the Hawkeyes, Minnesota as Gophers, Chicago as Maroons, and so forth. Why not give Iowa State Teachers College a name which signifies something characteristic about the school besides the fact that it is a teachers college?"

The article goes on to note that entries would be judged by a member of the Department of Physical Education, other faculty, and students.

When the contest was announced, the Iowa State Teachers College had already been participating in intercollegiate athletics on a regular and organized basis for over thirty-five years. Teachers College teams had participated in contests with other Iowa colleges, and occasionally with teams from outside the state, in baseball, football, basketball, and track and field. Until the end of World War I, students certainly did get excited about these contests, but they probably took just as much pleasure in the success of the school's debate and oratorical teams. The school's sole mission, the preparation of teachers, tended to attract many more women than men to the Teachers College. And, consequently, the school did not have an abundance of material from which to draw its athletes in the days when only men participated in intercollegiate athletics. Following the war, however, the college made a distinct effort to attract men to the teaching profession. An important part of this effort was the addition of physical education courses to the curriculum that would help to prepare men for teaching positions that included athletics coaching responsibilities. Improved athletics facilities, including the construction of the West Gymnasium, showed that the school was taking a more serious attitude toward intercollegiate athletics.

On September 18, 1931, the College Eye announced that Paul Bender, acting head of the Department of Physical Education for Men; George Holmes, professor of journalism; Robert Burley, president of the Student Council; and the sports editor of the College Eye would judge entries. The winner would receive a leather briefcase from the Berg Drug Company. Second place would be a dresser alarm clock from Chase Jewelry Store. Third place would be a season football pass.

The winning name "Purple Panthers" was submitted by Burl Berry, a center on the football team.

Sports sponsored

Softball 
In the 1977 AIAW Women's College World Series, the Panther softball team defeated Arizona, 7–0, in the deciding final game, led by pitcher Pat Stockman to earn the university's first team national championship. The softball team has appeared in four Women's College World Series, in 1973, 1975, 1976 and 1977. In 1982, then competing at the Division II level, the softball team won a second AIAW national title.

Wrestling 
The University of Northern Iowa Wrestling team, founded in 1923, won the NCAA (Single division) national championship in 1950 and the NCAA Division II national championships in 1975 and 1978. They competed in the Western Wrestling Conference until 2012, when UNI became an associate member of the Mid-American Conference since the MVC is a non-wrestling conference. The Panthers continued to compete in the MAC through the 2016–17 season, after which they moved to the Big 12.

Doug Schwab is the current head coach for the Northern Iowa Wrestling Team. Mission Statement - To communicate with UNI wrestling fans to support, encourage, promote a successful UNI wrestling tradition.

In the 2013–2014 season, head coach Doug Schwab led the Panthers to a perfect 13–0 season in dual meets, the only division one wrestling team to go undefeated.

Northern Iowa Panther Wrestling Accomplishments:

NCAA (Single division) Team Champions in 1950
NCAA Division II Team Champions in 1975
NCAA Division II Team Champions in 1978
NCAA (Single division) Team Runner-Up in 1946, 1947, 1949 and 1952
NCAA Division II Team Runner-Up in 1970, 1972, 1974 and 1980
NCAA (Single division) Team Third Place in 1937
NCAA Division II Team Third Place in 1963, 1967, 1969, 1976, 1977 and 1979.

Notable wrestlers:

 Olympic Gold Medalist (1952) William Smith wrestled for Iowa State Teachers College (1949 and 1950 NCAA champion)
 Olympic Silver Medalist (1948) Gerald Leeman wrestled for Iowa State Teachers College (1946 NCAA champion)
 Pan American Games Gold Medalist (1975) Mike McCready
 Pan American Games Gold Medalist (1993) Justin Greenlee
 Pan American Games Silver Medalist (1990) Mark Pustelnik
 Three-time NCAA Champion (1946-47-48) Bill Koll and member of the 1948 U.S. Olympic team, finishing 5th
 Three-time NCAA Champion (1947, 1949–50) Bill Nelson and member of the 1948 U.S. Olympic team
 Three-time NCAA Champion (1949-50-51) Keith Young
 Three-time NCAA Division II Champion (1976-77-78) Gary Bentrim
 Three-time NCAA Division II Champion (1978-79-80) and six-time All-American Kirk Meyers

Football

Men's basketball

NCAA Tournament history

Other tournaments 
 NAIA National Tournament appearances: 1946, 1948, 1949, and 1953 (2–4 combined tournament record)
Competed in the 2007 World University Games as Team USA (finished ninth)

Women's basketball 

Jacqui Kalin helped lead the women's basketball team to consecutive NCAA Tournament berths, as the team won back-to-back MVC Tournament titles. In her freshman year in 2007–08, she led the MVC with an .899 free throw percentage (a school record), and was named MVC Freshman of the Year. In 2010–11 she was named the Jackie Stiles MVC Player of the Year.  In 2012–13 she led the league in scoring (19.5 ppg; a school record), had the fourth-highest season free throw percentage in NCAA Division 1 history-and the highest of any senior (95.5%), and was again named the Jackie Stiles MVC Player of the Year. For her career Kalin was first all-time at UNI in scoring (2,081), 3-point field goals made (265), free throws made (484), and free throw percentage (.920; the NCAA Division 1 career record.

NCAA Tournament history

WNIT history

Baseball 
UNI's men's baseball program was discontinued after the 2008–2009 season.

In 1961, the Panthers led by future Baltimore RP Eddie Watt qualified for the NCAA Division 1 Baseball Tournament losing in the District 5 Final to eventual CWS Runner-Up Oklahoma State in Stillwater. The Panthers also qualified for the NCAA Tournament in 1958 and 2001. 

Other MLB players who attended UNI include Duane Josephson, the first Panther named All-American and who led the nation in HR's.

References

External links
 

 
NCAA Division I